Herrem is a surname. Notable people with the surname include:

Camilla Herrem (born 1986), Norwegian handball player
Geir André Herrem (born 1988), Norwegian footballer

See also
Herren